Hans Rose (April 18, 1885 – December 6, 1969) was one of the most successful and highly decorated German U-boat commanders in the Kaiserliche Marine during . He sank 79 ships for a total of  during the war.

World War I
In September 1916, Rose brought  to Newport, Rhode Island, to the surprise of American authorities. He proceeded to dock and then invite American naval officers and their wives aboard to view his vessel. After delivering a message to the German Ambassador he proceeded offshore to the lightship Nantucket. He sent five or six ships to the bottom, after questioning their captains on their cargo and ordering the abandonment of their ships.

On March 11, 1917, Rose, still in command of U-53, torpedoed and sank the 6705 ton Cunard Liner . On December 6, 1917, Rose torpedoed and sank , the first American destroyer lost in the First World War. In all, he sank 81 ships totalling  (excluding Jacob Jones) and damaged another nine.

On December 20, 1917. Rose was awarded the Pour le Mérite. He was also awarded the Ritterkreuz des Hohenzollerschen Hausordens mit Schwertern (Knights Cross of the Hohenzollern House Order with Swords).

World War II
Hans Rose was in command of 1. Unterseeboots-Ausbildungsabteilung (U-boat training unit) from February to May 1940.

References

External links
uboat.net webpage - Description of U-boat commands and sinkings by Hans Rose
theirishriviera.com webpage - Info about RMS Folia
 National Maritime Museum webpage - Portrait of Commander Rose on the deck of U-53 in the collection of the National Maritime Museum

U-boat commanders (Imperial German Navy)
Recipients of the Pour le Mérite (military class)
Imperial German Navy personnel of World War I
1885 births
1969 deaths
Kriegsmarine personnel
Recipients of the Hanseatic Cross (Bremen)
Recipients of the Order of the Medjidie
People from Charlottenburg
Military personnel from Berlin